The Virology Science and Technology Institute of the Philippines (VSTIP), also referred to as the Virology Institute of the Philippines (VIP), is a proposed virology research facility in the Philippines.

Background 
In response to the COVID-19 pandemic in the Philippines, proposals have been made to set up a virology research facility in the country. The Department of Science and Technology (DOST), headed by Secretary Fortunato de la Peña, announced in May 2020 that the science agency submitted a proposal to establish the Virology Institute of the Philippines, which is meant to conduct research on viruses and viral diseases affecting plants, animals, and humans. At that time, the Philippines only had the Research Institute for Tropical Medicine, which specializes in the research of infectious and tropical diseases.

History 
There were moves to institutionalize the proposed virology research institute through legislation by Congress, in the House of Representatives alone, at least seven bills have been filed by mid-August 2020. Within the same month, the institute project has been included in the Philippine national government's Build! Build! Build! infrastructure program of President Rodrigo Duterte.

In July 2021, the House bills for the institute and a center for disease control (CDC) were approved on their third and final reading. President Duterte included the institute in a list of priority measures that he mentioned during his sixth and final State of the Nation Address (SONA).

A new biosafety level 2+ (BSL-2+) laboratory is being prepared by the Department of Science and Technology for the VIP and is scheduled to be launched in October 2021. It will be placed under the Environment and Biotechnology Division of the DOST-Industrial Technology Development Institute (DOST-ITDI). It is also proposed that the Research Institute for Tropical Medicine (RITM) be placed under the VIP without abolishing the former.

Location 
The Virology Science and Technology Institute of the Philippines will be located at New Clark City in Capas, Tarlac. Five hectares of land have been allocated. The institute will include lecture halls, offices, greenhouses, and laboratories, including a BSL-4 lab, the first in the country.

References 

Virology institutes
Medical research institutes in the Philippines
Proposed buildings and structures in the Philippines